Hengshan County is a county in the Province of Hunan, China and it is under the administration of Hengyang prefecture-level city. Located in the north of Hengyang and the east-central part of Hunan province, the county is bordered to the north by Xiangtan County, to the northwest by Shuangfeng County, to the southwest and south by Hengyang County, Nanyue District and Hengnan County, to the east by Hengdong County. It has five townships and seven towns under its jurisdiction, the county seat is Kaiyun Town.

History
The county of Hengshan was named after the Hengshan Mountain, the place name of Hengshan was described in the Book of Documents (one of the Five Classics of ancient Chinese literature). It was belonged to the territory of Chu State in the Spring and Autumn period, it was part of Changsha Commandery in the Qin period and part of Xiangnan County of Changsha State in the Han period. The county of Hengyang (not modern Hengyang County) was created in 257 AD, its seat was located in modern Yonghe Township and the county of Hengyang was renamed to Hengshan in 290 AD. The National Teacher's College was located in the county in the late 1940s.

Divisions

7 towns
 Baiguo
 Changjiang
 Dianmen
 Donghu
 Kaiyun
 Xinqiao
 Xuanzhou

5 townships
 Futianpu
 Guantang
 Jiangdong
 Lingpo
 Yonghe

Climate

Economy 
According to preliminary accounting of the statistical authority, the gross domestic product of Hengshan County in 2017 was 16,722 million yuan (2,477 million US dollars), up by 8.6 percent over the previous year. Of this total, the value added of the primary industry was 3,210 million yuan (475 million US dollars), up by 3.3 percent, that of the secondary industry was 4,634 million yuan (686 million US dollars), up by 6.6 percent and that of the tertiary industry was 8,878 million yuan (1,315 million US dollars), up by 11.8 percent. The value added of the primary industry accounted for 19.20 percent of the GDP; that of the secondary industry accounted for 27.71 percent; and that of the tertiary industry accounted for 53.09 percent. The per capita GDP in 2017 was 43,416 yuan (6,430 US dollars).

References

External links
 Official Website

 
County-level divisions of Hunan
Hengyang